is a girls' junior and senior high school in Nada-ku, Kobe, Japan.

References

External links
 Kobe Kaisei Girls' Junior & Senior High School
 Kobe Kaisei Girls' Junior & Senior High School 

Private schools in Japan
Girls' schools in Japan
High schools in Hyōgo Prefecture
Education in Kobe